State of Mind is the second full-length studio album by electro-industrial artists Front Line Assembly. It was originally released in 1987 by Dossier on LP format and CD format later in 1988. State of Mind was later released on Cleopatra Records with alternate artwork and a bonus track, "Inside Out".

Band leader Bill Leeb said about choosing the label Dossier: "We just did it because I liked a lot of the other artists on the label."

Release
Cleopatra re-issued State of Mind on vinyl on April 29, 2016. This edition has the original 1987 track listing.

Track listing

Personnel

Front Line Assembly
 Bill Leeb – mixing, vocals
 Michael Balch – mixing

Technical personnel
 Manfred Schiek – sleeve design
 Dave Ogilvie – editing

References

Front Line Assembly albums
1988 albums
ROIR albums
Cleopatra Records albums
Dark ambient albums